Anthocleista is a genus of tree- and shrub-like tropical plants in the gentian family, tribe Potalieae, subtribe Potaliinae. There are about 50 species in the genus, native mainly to tropical Africa, including Madagascar and the Mascarene Islands. Anthocleista was once placed in the family Loganiaceae, but more recent molecular, morphological, and phytochemical evidence has placed the group well within the Gentianaceae.

Uses

Traditional Medicine
In Africa, traditional use of the plants of this species is used in diseases like Diabetes, Obesity, Hypertension,  Constipation (as laxative), Impotence, Fertility problems, Hyperprolactinemia, Sexual dysfunction, Malaria, Worms, STDs (Gonorrhea, Syphilis), Fever(as antipyretic), Rheumatism, Bronchitis, Typhoid Fever, Hemorrhoids, Hernia and Cancer. This review cited only in vitro and animal research in support of these putative health benefits.

Species
Species in this genus include:
Anthocleista amplexicaulis
Anthocleista djalonesis
Anthocleista exelliana
Anthocleista grandiflora
Anthocleista keniensis
Anthocleista liebrechstiana
Anthocleista madagascariensis
Anthocleista microphylla
Anthocleista nobilis
Anthocleista procera
Anthocleista rhizophoroides
Anthocleista scandens
Anthocleista schweinfurthii
Anthocleista talbotii
Anthocleista vogelii
Anthocleista zambesiaca

References

General references
Gentian Research Network

 
Gentianaceae genera